Hahella chejuensis is a Gram-negative, aerobic, rod-shaped and motile bacterium from the genus of Hahella which has been isolated from Marado in Korea.

References

Oceanospirillales
Bacteria described in 2001